Partial general elections were held in Belgium on 8 June 1880. In the elections for the Chamber of Representatives the result was a victory for the Liberal Party, which won 74 of the 132 seats. Voter turnout was 67.2%, although only 62,936 people were eligible to vote.

Under the alternating system, elections were only held in five out of the nine provinces: Antwerp, Brabant, Luxembourg, Namur and West Flanders.

A special election was held on 21 August 1880 to elect a representative for the arrondissement of Oudenaarde following the death of Auguste Devos on 21 July 1880. Florent De Bleeckere was elected to succeed him.

Results

Chamber of Representatives

References

1880s elections in Belgium
General
Belgium
Belgium